A warrior  is a person specializing in combat or warfare, especially within the context of a tribal or clan-based warrior culture society that recognizes a separate warrior aristocracy, class, or caste.

History

Warriors seem to have been present in the earliest pre-state societies. Scholars have argued that horse-riding Yamnaya warriors from the Pontic–Caspian steppe played a key role during the Indo-European migrations and the diffusion of Indo-European languages across Eurasia. Most of the basic weapons used by warriors appeared before the rise of most hierarchical systems. Bows and arrows, clubs, spears, swords, and other edged weapons were in widespread use. However, with the new findings of metallurgy, the aforementioned weapons had grown in effectiveness.

When the first hierarchical systems evolved 5000 years ago, the gap between the rulers and the ruled had increased. Making war to extend the outreach of their territories, rulers often forced men from lower orders of society into the military role. This had been the first use of professional soldiers —a distinct difference from the warrior communities.

The warrior ethic in many societies later became the preserve of the ruling class. Egyptian pharaohs would depict themselves in war chariots, shooting at enemies, or smashing others with clubs. Fighting was considered a prestigious activity, but only when associated with status and power. European mounted knights would often feel contempt for the foot soldiers recruited from lower classes. In Mesoamerican societies of pre-Columbian America, the elite aristocratic soldiers remained separated from the lower classes of stone-throwers. The samurai were the hereditary military nobility and officer caste of Japan from the 12th to the late 19th century.

In contrast to the beliefs of the caste and clan-based warrior, who saw war as a place to attain valor and glory, warfare was a practical matter that could change the course of history. History always showed that men of lower orders would almost always outfight warrior elites through an individualistic and humble approach to war, provided that they were practically organized and equipped. This was the approach of the Roman legions who had only the incentive of promotion, as well as a strict level of discipline. When Europe's standing armies of the 17th and 18th centuries developed, discipline was at the core of their training. Officers had the role of transforming men that they viewed as lower class to become reliable fighting men.

Inspired by the Ancient Greek ideals of the 'citizen soldier', many European societies during the Renaissance began to incorporate conscription and raise armies from the general populace. A change in attitude was noted as well, as officers were told to treat their soldiers with moderation and respect. For example, men who fought in the American Civil War often elected their own officers. With the mobilization of citizens in the armies sometimes reaching the millions, societies often made efforts in order to maintain or revive the warrior spirit. This trend continues to the modern day.
Due to the heroic connotations of the term "warrior", this metaphor is especially popular in publications advocating or recruiting for a country's military.

Warrior cultures

 Akinji
 Al-Haras
 Amazons
 Anglo-Saxons
 Apache
 Armatoloi
 Ashigaru
Assassin
 Aswaran
 Batavi
 Berserker
 Bogatyr
 Boxers
 Boyars
 Carthaginian
 Cataphract
 Celts
 Cheyenne
 Comanche
 Comitatus
 Condottieri
 Cossacks
 Crusader
 Curetes
 Dacians
 Dahomey Amazons
 Dog soldier
 Druids
 Druzhina
 Eagle warrior
Eso Ikoyi
 Eight Banners
 Gabiniani
 Gallowglass
 Gargareans
 Ghazi
 Gladiator
 Gurkha
 Hajduks
 Harii
 Hashashin
 Hersir
 Herules
Hessian
 Highlander
 Hippeis
 Hird
 Hoplite
 Hospitaller
 Housecarl
 Hulubalang
 Huns
 Hyksos
 Hwarang
 Immortals
 Zulu's Impi
 Jaguar warrior
 Janissary
 Jinyiwei
 Jund
 Karaiyar
 Karava
 Kassites
 Khalsa
 Kheshig
 Kipchaks
 Klephts
 Knights
 Knights Templar
 Kshetri
 Leidang
 Maccabees
 Macedonians
 Maharlika
 Mangudai
 Mamluk 
 Māori people
 Maravar
 Maratha
 Mongols
 Morlachs
 Moro People
 Medjay
 Mesedi
 Mingghan
 Mukkuvar
 Nair
 Nakh peoples
 Ninja/Kunoichi
 Normans
 Numerus Batavorum
 Onna-musha
 Optimatoi
 Pirates
 Quilombo
 Rajput
 Red Lantern Sect
 Reddy
 Romans
 Ror
 Rus' people
 Saini
 Samurai
 Scordisci
 Scythians
 Seminole
 Sengunthar
 Shaolin
 Shieldmaiden
 Sioux
Sikh 
 Nihang
 Sipahi
 Sohei
 Somatophylakes
 Spartan
 Timawa
 Teutonic Knights
 Thingmen
 Triballi
 Trojans
 Uskoks 
 Valkyrie
 Varangian Guard
 Velir or Vellalar
 Vikings
 Virago
 Voynuks
 White Lotus Sect

See also
 Endemic warfare
 Deadliest Warrior
 Honour
 Martial races
 Soldier
 Warg
Women warriors in literature and culture

References

Bibliography

 Ayvazyan A. "The Code of Honor of the Armenian Military (4-5th centuries)" (2000).
 Shannon E. French, Code of the Warrior - Exploring Warrior Values Past and Present (2003).

External links
 Roman Warriors: The Myth of the Military Machine

Anthropology
Combat occupations
Social classes
Social divisions
Stock characters
 
Warrior code
Gendered occupations
Men's social titles
Western (genre) staples and terminology